The Cameroon Hymnal is a book of hymns used in Cameroon. The Catholic Church sing songs from it during every season of the church calendar. The hymnal contained 349 hymns. There have been numerous changes to the book over the years. Information technology students at the Catholic University Institute of Buea (CUIB) created Android and Windows versions in 2013.

History
The Cameroon Hymnal was first published in 1984. The second publication was in 1997 and was approved by the archbishop of Bamenda, Paul Verdzekov. The third edition was published in 2000 and the fourth in 2003.
 
The 1997 edition was published by a committee of priest and laymen. The hymnal is made of 350 hymns.

References

Catholic hymnals